Zbigniew Krzysztof Kuźmiuk (born 19 September 1956 in Komorowo) is a Polish  politician and Member of the European Parliament (MEP) for Masovian Voivodeship with the Law and Justice party, part of the European Conservatives and Reformists and sits on the European Parliament's Committee on Budgets. Prior to 2006, Kuźmiuk was a leading member of the Polish People's Party.

Kuźmiuk is a substitute for the Committee on Economic and Monetary Affairs and a member of the Delegation to the EU-Bulgaria Joint Parliamentary Committee.

Education
 1989: Master of Economics, Kielce University of Technology (1979), Doctor of Economics Warsaw School of Planning and Statistics (now the Warsaw School of Economics)
 Lecturer at the Radom Polytechnic (since 1979), chairman of the production-service-trading company (PPHU) Teks SA

Career
 1990–94: and director PPHU Bakumar SA
 1994–96: Voivode of Radom
 1997: Minister, member of the Cabinet, Chairman of the State Centre for Strategic Studies
 1998–2001: Councillor of the Masovian Voivodeship, Marshal of the Masovian Voivodeship
 2001–04: Member of Parliament of the Republic of Poland, Chairman of the Parliamentary Committee on Local Self-Government and Regional Policy, Chairman of the Polish People's Party (PSL) parliamentary party
 2003: Vice-Chairman of the Chief Executive Committee of the PSL (since March 2004), Vice-Chairman of the Masovian Voivodship Association of the PSL (since October

Decorations
 Knight's Cross of the Order of Poland Reborn

See also
 2004 European Parliament election in Poland

External links
 
 
 

1956 births
Living people
Polish People's Party MEPs
Law and Justice MEPs
MEPs for Poland 2004–2009
MEPs for Poland 2014–2019
MEPs for Poland 2019–2024
Members of the Polish Sejm 2001–2005
Members of the Polish Sejm 2011–2015
Voivodeship marshals of Poland
Masovian Voivodeship